Khanomabad may refer to:
Khanomabad, Kermanshah, Kermanshah Province
Khanomabad, Javanrud, Kermanshah Province
Khanomabad, Ravansar, Kermanshah Province
Khanomabad, Kurdistan
Khanomabad, Qazvin